is a Japanese comedian, television presenter, actor, voice actor and plays the boke in Ameagari Kesshitai. His partner is Tōru Hotoharu. He is represented by Yoshimoto Kogyo. Miyasako won the award for Best Supporting Actor at the 28th Hochi Film Awards for Thirteen Steps and Wild Berries.

Career

In June 2019, Miyasako, alongside other Yoshimoto Kogyo affiliated comedians, were suspended from activities due to attending parties held by the yakuza and receiving . On July 19, 2019, Miyasako was fired from Yoshimoto Kogyo and held a press conference the following day, accepting the scandal and condemning his part in the yakuza while citing Yoshimoto's own involvement in the scandal. 

On July 21, 2019, Yoshimoto issued a press conference to reinstate Miyasako's contract. His ban was lifted on August 19, 2019 but he remains inactive as of January 2020. On January 28, 2020, Miyasako created a YouTube channel and upload videos regularly. Miyasako's YouTube channel hit 1 million subscribers on July 6.

Filmography

Film
Thirteen Steps (2003)
Wild Berries (2003)
Casshern (2004)
Kamikaze Girls (2004)
Tokyo Tower (2005)
The Great Yokai War (2005)
Mōryō no Hako (2007)
Big Man Japan (2007)
20th Century Boys (2008)
Cafe Isobe (2008)
Mega Monster Battle: Ultra Galaxy (2009)
Ultraman Zero: The Revenge of Belial (2010)

Television
Yōkai Ningen Bem (anime) (2006)
Ryōmaden (2010)
Zettai Reido (2010)

Video Games
Yakuza 3 (2009) (Tsuyoshi Kanda)
Yakuza 6: The Song of Life (2016) (Tsuyoshi Nagumo)

Japanese dub
Goal! (2006) (Zinedine Zidane)
The Avengers (2012) (Hawkeye (Jeremy Renner))
Avengers: Age of Ultron (2015) (Hawkeye (Jeremy Renner))
Captain America: Civil War (2016) (Hawkeye (Jeremy Renner))
Avengers: Endgame (2019) (Hawkeye (Jeremy Renner))

Stage play
Kūchū Buranko (2008)

References

External links

 

1970 births
Living people
People from Osaka
Japanese comedians
Japanese male actors
Japanese YouTubers